The School District of the Chathams is a regional public school district serving students in pre-kindergarten through twelfth grade from Chatham Borough and Chatham Township in Morris County, New Jersey.

As of the 2020–21 school year, the district, comprised of six schools, had an enrollment of 3,930 students and 342.8 classroom teachers (on an FTE basis), for a student–teacher ratio of 11.5:1.

The district is classified by the New Jersey Department of Education as being in District Factor Group "J", the-highest of eight groupings. District Factor Groups organize districts statewide to allow comparison by common socioeconomic characteristics of the local districts. From lowest socioeconomic status to highest, the categories are A, B, CD, DE, FG, GH, I and J.

Elections were held in both municipalities in November 1986 to consider joining the disparate school systems of the two communities into a combined regional district.  This proposal was supported by the voters and since then, the two municipalities have shared a regionalized school district.

Awards, recognition and rankings
For the 2004-05 school year, Chatham High School was recognized with the Blue Ribbon School Award of Excellence by the United States Department of Education, the highest award an American school can receive. Milton Avenue School was one of 11 in the state to be recognized in 2014 by the United States Department of Education's National Blue Ribbon Schools Program. In 2015, Southern Boulevard School was one of 15 schools in New Jersey, and one of nine public schools, recognized as a National Blue Ribbon School in the exemplary high performing category.

The district's high school was the 1st-ranked public high school in New Jersey out of 339 schools statewide in New Jersey Monthly magazine's September 2014 cover story on the state's "Top Public High Schools", using a new ranking methodology. The school had been ranked 20th in the state of 328 schools in 2012, after being ranked 8th in 2010 out of 322 schools listed.

Schools
Schools in the district (with 2020–21 enrollment data from the National Center for Education Statistics) are:

Elementary schools
Milton Avenue School with 284 students in grades PreK-3
Nicholas Andreazza, Principal
Southern Boulevard School with 414 students in grades K-3
Marco Freyre, Principal
Washington Avenue School with 314 students in grades K-3
Kristen Crawford, Acting Principal
Lafayette School with 592 students in grades 4-5
Cheryl Russo, Principal
Middle school
Chatham Middle School with 984 students in grades 6-8
Jill Gihorski, Principal
High school
Chatham High School with 1,315 students in grades 9-12
Douglas Walker, Principal

Administration
Core members of the district's administration are:
Dr. Michael LaSusa, Superintendent
Peter Daquila, Business Administrator / Board Secretary

Board of education
The district's board of education is comprised of nine members who set policy and oversee the fiscal and educational operation of the district through its administration. As a Type II school district, the board's trustees are elected directly by voters to serve three-year terms of office on a staggered basis, with three seats up for election each year held (since 2016) as part of the November general election. The board appoints a superintendent to oversee the district's day-to-day operations and a business administrator to supervise the business functions of the district. Seats on the board are allocated to the constituent municipalities based on population, with Chatham Township assigned five seats and Chatham Borough assigned four seats.

References

External links
School District of the Chathams website

School District of the Chathams, National Center for Education Statistics

Chatham Borough, New Jersey
Chatham Township, New Jersey
New Jersey District Factor Group J
School districts in Morris County, New Jersey
https://www.greatschools.org/new-jersey/chatham/the-school-district-of-the-chathams/